Jagdish Gill (born December 5, 1984 in Calcutta, India) is an Indian-born Canadian field hockey player, who played for the Canada national field hockey team at the 2015 Pan American Games and won a silver medal.

In 2016, he was named to Canada's Olympic team.

References

External links
 

Living people
Field hockey players at the 2011 Pan American Games
Field hockey players at the 2015 Pan American Games
1984 births
Canadian male field hockey players
Pan American Games silver medalists for Canada
Field hockey players at the 2016 Summer Olympics
Olympic field hockey players of Canada
Pan American Games medalists in field hockey
Field hockey players from Kolkata
Indian emigrants to Canada
Naturalized citizens of Canada
Canadian people of Punjabi descent
Canadian sportspeople of Indian descent
Medalists at the 2011 Pan American Games